Retrachydes thoracicus is a species of beetle in the family Cerambycidae, the only species in the genus Retrachydes.

Description
This species has a transversely gibbous pronotum and orange-banded long antennae. Body is densely pubescent.

Distribution
This species is present in South America (Argentina, Brazil, Uruguay, Paraguay and Bolivia).

References

Trachyderini
Beetles described in 1790